Thomas Hastings (March 11, 1860 – October 22, 1929) was an American architect, a partner in the firm of Carrère and Hastings (active 1885–1929).

Biography 
He was born in New York City to Thomas Samuel Hastings, a Presbyterian minister, and Fanny de Groot.  Hastings came from a colonial Yankee background, his ancestor Thomas Hastings having come from the East Anglia region of England to the Massachusetts Bay Colony in 1634. Hastings's father was president of the Union Theological Seminary. His grandfather, also named Thomas Hastings, was the composer of the hymn Rock of Ages. He married Helen Benedict of Greenwich, Connecticut.

Hastings abandoned his college preparation courses to work with the chief designer at Herter Brothers, the premier New York furnishers and decorators. He later traveled to Paris to study in the atelier of Louis-Jules André, returned to the U.S. to found the firm of Carrère and Hastings with John Merven Carrère. Their first major commissions came from a parishioner of Hastings' father, Florida developer Henry Flagler. The partners undertook two hotels for Flagler, the Ponce de Leon Hotel (1885–1888) in St. Augustine, Florida (now part of Flagler College) and the Hotel Alcazar (now the Lightner Museum), followed by a succession of St. Augustine hotels and churches.

The firm's most famous project was undoubtedly the New York Public Library at Fifth Avenue and 42nd Street—not only an important example of its type but one of New York's most recognizable landmarks. They were also instrumental in creating the profession of urban planning, with Carrére's influential designs for Cleveland, Hartford and Atlantic City. Their varied work included the Manhattan Bridge (1899), the House and Senate Office Buildings in Washington, and Blairsden, the C. Ledyard Blair estate in Peapack, New Jersey (1896), one of the nation's greatest country houses.

After Carrère's death in 1911, Hastings went on to design the Arlington National Cemetery Tomb of the Unknowns and the Henry Clay Frick House on Fifth Avenue, as well as residences for such distinguished names as Guggenheim, duPont, Harriman, even a 'poultry cottage' for William K. Vanderbilt.   He also designed the Fort Washington Presbyterian Church (1913).  He designed the 435-foot (132.59 m) tall Tower of Jewels, the centerpiece of San Francisco's 1915 Panama–Pacific International Exposition.  After World War I, Hastings designed Kumler Chapel at Miami University in Oxford, Ohio in 1917-18, and designed the American Monument in Meaux, France, that memorialized the defeat of Germany at the Second Battle of the Marne, finally completed in 1932 after Hastings' death.

Hastings was a founding member of the U.S. Commission of Fine Arts, serving from 1910 to 1917. In 1906, he was elected into the National Academy of Design as an Associate member, and became a full Academician in 1909.

Hastings outlived the Beaux-Arts world. Though he dressed up the Manhattan Bridge in a Beaux-Arts skin and helped clad conservative office buildings in Roman masonry, he denounced skyscrapers as "bad in style, definitely bad for city traffic and the health of the citizenry". He felt a zoning law should have been passed to limit their height to a maximum of eight stories as has been done successfully in Paris.

Gallery

Notes

References 
 David Nolan, Fifty Feet in Paradise:  The Booming of Florida (Harcourt Brace Jovanovich, 1984).
 Mark Alan Hewitt, Kate Lemos, William Morrison, Charles Warren. Carrére and Hastings, Architects. 2 vols. (New York, Acanthus Press: 2006).

External links

 Carrère & Hastings Digital Collection, with over 200 drawings for the Ponce de Leon Hotel (now Flagler College), the Memorial Presbyterian Church in St. Augustine, and select others
 Descendants of Thomas Hastings website
 Descendants of Thomas Hastings on Facebook

1860 births
1929 deaths
American Presbyterians
Architects from New York City
Recipients of the Royal Gold Medal
American alumni of the École des Beaux-Arts
Fellows of the American Institute of Architects
Members of the American Academy of Arts and Letters